The Youth Empowerment Scheme, or YES, was a charity in Belfast that offered a mentoring service to children between 11 and 14 years old.

History
YES was established in 2001 by participants on the Washington Ireland Program including Chris Johnston, Ryan Moffett, Sarah Quinlan and Andrea Erskine and was based on Teamwork for Tomorrow, a similar scheme run by students at Notre Dame University, United States.

In 2004 YES was awarded the BT Link Award for Challenge with the University of Ulster.

Approach
YES aimed at empowering the young people of Belfast and encouraging them to be active citizens in their city. It held that youth mentoring can provide young people with positive role models, support and encouragement, and is thus the most effective way of helping them reach their fullest potential as citizens and productive members of society.

YES aimed to promote the social inclusion of young people of ethnic, religious, educational and social economic diversity. To contribute to the creation of a tolerant, pluralist society in Belfast, free from racism, sectarianism and anti-Semitism, YES ran weekly workshops that explained and celebrated the diversity of cultures in the city. In 2005 a project entitled 'Gaining Voice' culminated in the release of a short film written and produced by the young participants in the Scheme. Mirroring the format of the party political broadcasts that were airing on local television that spring, it highlighted issues of concern to young people, such as peer pressure, bullying and racism.

Operations
The Youth Empowerment Scheme was run primarily by student volunteers from the University of Ulster and Queen's University Belfast. Volunteers received training in child mentoring and in child protection policy and procedures.

Fundraising activities
YES relied on the goodwill of volunteers in terms of time and also donations to run the charity. Some successful charity fundraisers included 'A night at the movies'.

Film fans came together at the Sheridan IMAX movie theatre to raise over £1,500 in box-office takings for a children's charity.'The silver screen worked its magic for the Youth Empowerment Scheme (YES), a cross community, multi-ethnic charity set up by UU and QUB students to work as mentors with children aged 11–14. Featuring live jazz as well as cinema the special fundraising event - billed as ‘A Night at the Movies’.

References

Mentorships
Children's charities based in Northern Ireland